During the 2003–04 Dutch football season, Feyenoord competed in the Eredivisie.

Season summary
Feyenoord equaled last's seasons results and finished 3rd, with 12 points less than the previous year. The club made it to the quarter-finals in the domestic KNVB cup, losing to FC Twente. In the UEFA cup they made it to the 2nd round losing to the FK Teplice from Czech Republic.

Kits
Feyenoord's kits were manufactured by Italian company Kappa and sponsored by insurance company Stad Rotterdam Verzekeringen.

Squad
Squad at end of season
In brackets where they came from.

Left club during season

Left club at the end of previous season

Results

Eredivisie

KNVB Cup

UEFA Cup

Friendlies

References

Notes

Feyenoord seasons
Feyenoord